The Trinidad and Tobago women's national field hockey team represents Trinidad and Tobago in women's international field hockey competitions.

Tournament record

Pan American Games
1987 – 4th place
1991 – 7th place
1995 – 5th place
1999 – 4th place
2003 – 6th place
2011 – 7th place

Pan American Cup
 2004 – 8th place
 2009 – 4th place
 2013 – 7th place
 2022 – 6th place

Central American and Caribbean Games
 1986 – 
 1990 – 
 1993 – 
 2002 – 
 2006 – 4th place
 2010 – 
 2014 – 4th place
 2018 – 
 2023 – Qualified

Pan American Challenge
2021 – Qualified

Commonwealth Games
 1998 – 7th place
 2010 – 9th place
 2014 – 10th place

Hockey World League
 2012–13 – 25th place
 2014–15 – 30th place
 2016–17 – 33rd place

See also
Trinidad and Tobago men's national field hockey team

References

External links
Official website

Americas women's national field hockey teams
National team
Field hockey